The Eliel House is a house at 4122 South Ellis Avenue in Chicago, Illinois, United States.  The house was built in 1886 by Adler & Sullivan for Mathilde Eliel. It was designated a Chicago Landmark on October 2, 1991.

References

Houses completed in 1886
Houses in Chicago
Chicago Landmarks